Living Word Christian Fellowship is a church in Lee Green, South East London, England. It was founded by Curdell McLeod in 2000 as an independent church and then launched in 2001. It is a black-majority church.

Pastors
The pastors of the church are Curdell and Herby McLeod. Originally from Jamaica, both came to Britain in the 1950s. In the 1970s, they started a Homework Study Centre, facilitating after-school supplementary education for local underachieving and underprivileged children. Curdell previously worked in the Civil Service and in education.

In 1992 Curdell left her job as Deputy Principal of a further education college to enter full-time Christian ministry. She has been involved in pastoral ministry since 1988 through radio ministry on London's Premier Christian Radio, a TV series called The Living Word on Sky TV Channel 173 – HCN, and teaching at Hampstead Bible College and South London Christian College. She had an international ministry and a regular magazine feature called Living Faith in Keep the Faith magazine until her death in 2019.

Connections
The church has a number of affiliations with other churches and organisations. Of note is the ministry of Bill Hammon and Christian International. They also have a relationship with Ron and Jane Jolliff of Northside Community Church, Columbus, Ohio.{
There are also links with Ellel Ministries.

LWCF is a member of The Evangelical Alliance of Great Britain, The African and Caribbean Evangelical Alliance and Churches in Communities International under the leadership of Hugh Osgood.

Critics and controversy
The Word of Faith emphasis adhered to by LWCF is widespread within Pentecostal churches. It has been criticised and has created controversy in theological circles, particularly in academia. One of the earliest critics of the teaching was Oral Roberts University Professor Charles Farah, who published From the Pinnacle of the Temple in 1979. In the book, Farah expressed his disillusionment with the teachings, which he argued were more about presumption than faith.

In 1982, one of Farah's students, Daniel Ray McConnell, submitted a thesis to the faculty at Oral Roberts University arguing against E. W. Kenyon, Kenneth Hagin and the doctrines of the Word of Faith. Other critics have included Hank Hanegraaff, Norman Geisler, Dave Hunt and Roger Oakland.

References

External links
LWCF website
Keep the Faith magazine

Churches in the London Borough of Lewisham
Pentecostal churches in London